Ancyloceratidae is a family of heteromorphic ammonites that lived during the Early Cretaceous.  Their shells begin as a loose spiral with whorls not touching which then turns into a straight shaft that ends in a J-shape hook or bend at end. Coarse ribbing and spines are common.

Ancyloceratidae is the type family for the Ancyloceratoidea and of the suborder Ancyloceratina. They are found in Lower Cretaceous, Barremian to perhaps Lower Albian sediments.

Genera include:
Ammonitoceras Dumas, 1876
Ancyloceras D'Orbigny, 1842 - type genus
Ancylotropaeum Casey, 1980
Antarcticoceras Thomson, 1974 
Audouliceras Thomel, 1965
Australiceras Whitehouse, 1926
Caspianites Casey, 1961
Epancyloceras Spath, 1930
Epitroapeum Kakabadze, 1977
Helicancyloceras Klinger & Kennedy, 1977
Hoheneggericeras Delanoy et al. 2008
Jaubertites Sarkar, 1955
Kutatissites Kakabadze, 1970
Koeneniceras Mikhailova & Baraboshkin, 2002
Laqueoceras Kakabadze & Hoedemaeker, 2004
Lithancylus Casey, 1960
Luppovia Bogdanova et al. 1978
Proaustraliceras Kakabadze, 1977
Pseudoancyloceras Stenshin et al., 2014
Pseudoaustraliceras Kakabadze, 1981
Pseudocrioceras Spath, 1924
Sarkariceras Vermeulen, 2006
Shastoceras Anderson, 1938
Toxancyloceras Delanoy, 2003
Tropaeum J. de C. Sowerby, 1837

Ancyloceratidae are derived from the Crioceratidae, a family of Lower Cretaceous ammonites with loosely wound, open planispiral shells, probably originating from within the suborder Lytoceratina.

Notes

References

Ancyloceratoidea
Ammonitida families
Hauterivian first appearances
Early Cretaceous extinctions